The Nazi Lowriders (or NLR, or The Ride) are a Neo-Nazi, White supremacist organized crime syndicate, and prison and street gang based primarily in metro Los Angeles and several areas around Texas. They also are believed to have spread to other states, having small rural and suburban factions. They are allies of the larger and more notorious gangs, such as the Aryan Brotherhood and the Mexican Mafia, and fellow peckerwood gang Public Enemy No. 1. Their main rivals are the Bloods, the Crips, the Black Guerrilla Family, MS-13, Norteños, and Nuestra Familia. The Nazi Lowriders operate both in and outside of prison. Methamphetamine abuse is common among members of the group. The NLR's acts of violence have even seen victims from the general public, including police officers.

History 
The gang originated in the California Youth Authority during the mid-to-late 1970s. It was created by members from Aryan Brotherhood. The gang did not come to the attention of law enforcement until the early 1990s, by which time the California authorities had been cracking down on the Brotherhood. As opposed to other white criminal gangs in California prisons, the NLR gained a reputation for being very violent. They are labeled as a prison gang by the California Department of Corrections. They are strong in numbers in such California communities as Oildale, Bakersfield, Lancaster, Inland Empire, Rosamond and Orange County. The "Nazi" part of their name is more a sign of a racist belief in white supremacy than anti-Semitism, while "Lowriders" is a play on the term used for Hispanic gangs.

The gang eventually progressed from being muscle for the Aryan Brotherhood to a fast-growing gang in their own right. Unlike other white supremacist gangs in the US, they appear to be well organized and have developed links with other white organizations throughout the West Coast, including the Ku Klux Klan and Hells Angels. Paroled gang members have been known to move east to further spread the organization's reach.

On January 28, 1999, California prison officials recognized the Lowriders as a prison gang. Consequently, in an attempt to disrupt the gang's criminal activities, inmates known to be members can now be subjected to removal from the general population, as well as other restrictive treatments. To this, the Lowriders have responded by striking an alliance with Public Enemy No. 1, another white disruptive group, which has since taken over the reins on California's white mainline prison population. Where Aryan Brotherhood and NLR have left off, PENI or Public Enemy No. 1 (Pronounced 'PEE NYE') plan to continue the 'key holding'.

Organization and members 
In prison, the Nazi Lowriders have a three-tier hierarchy system consisting of senior members, junior members, and kids. The seniors typically lead the gang. For senior status, gang members must have been active for at least five years and been elected by at least three other senior members. Below them are juniors, who cannot themselves induct new members but can attempt to recruit potentials. Kids usually come from gangs like Public Enemy No.1, and the senior member who inducts them becomes their mentor. On the streets, the organization structure is not so clear, and appears to be more loosely connected.

Gang members may have tattoos and other body art depicting swastikas and SS sigrunes, although members are not necessarily required to bear them. A tattoo of the letters NLR (the acronym for "Nazi Lowriders") commonly appears on members' stomachs, backs or necks. Other popular tattoos include "Nazi Low Riders" written in Old English script or the runic alphabet. The logo of the NLR is a skeletal eagle holding a Nazi swastika, with the letters of the group based on the Reichsadler symbol.

According to the SPLC, "Despite the NLR's avowed racism, Latino last names and Latino wives and girlfriends are OK, but, experts say, members are supposed to be at least half Caucasian.". In fact, much of the NLR's upper echelon is composed of Hispanics. Due to their extreme underground ties with other hardcore, racial organizations (such as Combat 18 Blood and Honour), experts say, "you must be at least half white blood but no black blood", meaning accepted Latino members must be only of Spanish descent, or be at least half Caucasian. All must show loyalty to the white race and subscribe to an ideology of hatred, especially against blacks and "race traitors".

Criminal activity 
The organization is involved in criminal activity both in and out of prison, notably in the production and distribution of methamphetamine, and has become a distributor of the drug in Southern California.

This gang is responsible for dozens of assaults, attempted murders, and murders around Southern California and is considered an extremely dangerous and violent gang.

In popular culture
 In the 2017 crime film Shot Caller, Jacob "Money" Harlon briefly has a cellmate named Ripper (played by Keith Jardine) who is a member of the Nazi Lowriders, sporting an "NLR" tattoo across his forehead.

See also
 White supremacy
Peckerwood

References

External links 

 Anti-Defamation League - The Nazi Low Riders
 California Department of Justice - Organized Crime in California 2004 Annual Report

Organizations established in the 1970s
1970s establishments in California
Prison gangs in the United States
Street gangs
Aryan Brotherhood
Peckerwood
White nationalism in California
Gangs in Los Angeles